is a Japanese politician of the Democratic Party of Japan, a member of the House of Councillors in the Diet (national legislature). A native of Akashi, Hyōgo and graduate of the University of Tokyo, he joined the Ministry of International Trade and Industry in 1986. He was elected to the House of Councillors for the first time in 2001.

References

External links 
 Official website in Japanese.

Members of the House of Councillors (Japan)
Living people
1964 births
Democratic Party of Japan politicians
People from Akashi, Hyōgo